This was the first edition of the women's event.

Wang Xinyu and Zheng Saisai won the title, defeating Dalila Jakupović and Nuria Párrizas Díaz in the final, 6–1, 6–1.

Seeds
All seeds received a bye into the quarterfinals, along with one other team.

Draw

Draw

References

External links
Main draw

2021 WTA 125 tournaments
Columbus Challenger